This partial list of city nicknames in Alaska compiles the aliases, sobriquets and slogans that cities and towns in Alaska are known by (or have been known by historically), officially and unofficially, to municipal governments, local people, outsiders or their tourism boards or chambers of commerce. 

City nicknames can help establish a civic identity, help outsiders recognize a community, attract people to a community because of its nickname, promote civic pride, and build community unity. 

Nicknames and slogans that successfully create a new community "ideology or myth" are also believed to have economic value. This value is difficult to measure, but there are anecdotal reports of cities that have achieved substantial economic benefits by "branding" themselves with new slogans.

Some unofficial nicknames are positive, while others are derisive. The unofficial nicknames listed here have been in use for a long time or have gained wide currency.
Anchorage
Air Crossroads of the World
Anchortown
The City of Lights and Flowers (or City of Lights)
Hanging Basket Capital of the World
Los Anchorage
Rage City (in reference to roller derby and punk culture)
Cordova
Clam Town
Razor Clam Capital
Fairbanks – The Golden Heart CityRebecca George, The Golden Heart City celebrates its golden past , Fairbanks Daily News Miner, August 6, 2009.
Haines – Eagle Capital of America
Homer 
 Halibut Capital of the World; Halibut Fishing Capital of the World
 Cosmic Hamlet by the Sea
Kenai – The Village With a Past, the City With a Future
Ketchikan – King Salmon Capital of the World
Knik  – Dog-Mushing Center of the WorldKnik - Fairview Alaska , accessed March 29, 2007. "Knik is a check-point for the Iditarod Sled Dog Race, and is called the 'Dog Mushing Center of the World.'"
Kodiak – King Crab Capital
Sitka
First City of Alaska
The Natural Place to VisitTagline Guru City Branding Survey, Tagline Guru website, accessed August 18, 2009

See also
 List of city nicknames in the United States
 List of places in Alaska

References

Alaska cities and towns
City nicknames
Populated places in Alaska